The Women's College World Series Most Outstanding Player is an award for the best individual performance during the Women's College World Series, the college softball national championship event in the United States. The recipient of the award is announced at the completion of the Women's College World Series Championship Game. The award is similar to Major League Baseball's World Series Most Valuable Player award and college baseball's College World Series Most Outstanding Player award.

Voting process
The press attending the championship series vote on the Most Outstanding Player during the game. In the fifth inning, ballots are distributed. The voting is closed by the eighth inning. The Most Outstanding Player is announced following the awarding of trophies to the runner-up and championship teams. If a third game of the championship series is necessary, the ballots taken during the second game are discarded, and a new round of balloting is conducted during the third and deciding game.

List

See also

 List of sports awards honoring women
 Women's College World Series

References

Awards established in 1995
College softball trophies and awards in the United States
Most valuable player awards
Women's College World Series